Sir John Nicolson, 2nd Baronet, of Lasswade was a member of the Parliament of Scotland.

Biography
Nicolson was the son of John Nicolson of Pilton, who died in 1648. In May 1651 he succeeded his grandfather Sir John Nicolson, 1st Baronet, in the baronetcy and the estate of Lasswade. He was shire commissioner for Edinburgh from 1672 to 1674. His wife was Elizabeth, daughter of William Dick of Braid. Their sons included Sir John Nicolson, 3rd Baronet and Sir William Nicolson, 4th Baronet.

References

Baronets in the Baronetage of Nova Scotia
Members of the Parliament of Scotland 1669–1674
John
People from Midlothian
Year of birth missing
Year of death missing